Glenn Creamer is a Senior Advisor and Senior Managing Director Emeritus of Providence Equity Partners, a global private equity firm based in Providence, Rhode Island which manages funds with US$32 billion in commitments.

Early life and education

Creamer grew up in Rhode Island. He graduated from Brown University in 1984 with a Bachelor of Arts in Economics and International Relations. Creamer graduated Harvard Business School in 1988 with a Master of Business Administration.

Career

Creamer worked in investment banking at Merrill Lynch and later at J.P. Morgan & Co. Upon graduating HBS, Creamer joined Narragansett Capital, a private equity firm based in Providence, Rhode Island.

Subsequently, Creamer helped found Providence Equity Partners, one of the world’s leading industry-focused private equity firms.

Philanthropy

Creamer serves as chairman of the Catholic Relief Services Foundation, which raises funds to support the work of Catholic Relief Services. CRS works in over 100 countries. 

Creamer is chairman of the World Affairs Councils of America, based in Washington DC. WACA is the nation’s largest nonpartisan grassroots organization dedicated to engaging the American public in foreign affairs.

Creamer is president of the Thomas Becket Foundation at Brown University. He also serves on the boards of the Rhode Island School of Design Museum, Mustard Seed Communities, and the American Friends of Jamaica. He is a member of the board of dean’s advisors at the Harvard Business School.

References

1962 births
Living people
21st-century American businesspeople
Brown University alumni
Harvard Business School alumni